Novouzensky Uyezd (Новоузенский уезд) was one of the subdivisions of the Samara Governorate of the Russian Empire. It was situated in the southern part of the governorate. Its administrative centre was Novouzensk.

Demographics
At the time of the Russian Empire Census of 1897, Novouzensky Uyezd had a population of 417,376. Of these, 39.9% spoke Russian, 36.8% German, 17.0% Ukrainian, 3.1% Tatar, 1.6% Kazakh, 0.9% Mordvin, 0.2% Estonian, 0.2% Bashkir, 0.1% Lithuanian and 0.1% Polish as their native language.

References

 
Uezds of Samara Governorate
Samara Governorate